The QNet Open was a tournament for professional female tennis players played on outdoor hardcourts in 2014. The event was classified as a $50,000 ITF Circuit tournament and held in New Delhi, India at the DLTA Complex. The tournament was sponsored by Qnet, a Hong Kong-based multi-level marketing company.

In November 2014, the Mumbai Police's economic offences wing asked the All India Tennis Association for clarification of the tournament's sponsorship, as hundreds of the firm's accounts have been frozen.

Editions

Singles

Doubles

References

ITF Women's World Tennis Tour
Sport in New Delhi
Tennis in India
Defunct sports competitions in India
Defunct tennis tournaments in Asia
Tennis tournaments in India
Recurring sporting events established in 2014
Recurring sporting events disestablished in 2014